Events in the year 1992 in Portugal.

Incumbents
 President: Mário Soares
 Prime Minister: Aníbal Cavaco Silva

Events

 23 May – Lisbon Protocol signed
 21 December – Martinair Flight 495 accident, worst accident in the history of Faro Airport.

Arts and entertainment
 6 October – Sociedade Independente de Comunicação launched
 Portugal in the Eurovision Song Contest 1992

Sports
 1992 Portuguese Grand Prix
 Vitória Pico da Pedra founded

Births
 10 January – Mauro Antunes, footballer
 11 February – João Carlos Nogueira Amorim, footballer
 17 April – Filipe Daniel Mendes Barros, footballer
 26 May – Leandro Albano, footballer
 3 July – Vítor Hugo Silva Azevedo, footballer
 26 July – João Filipe Amorim Gomes, footballer
 6 October – Carlos Eduardo Ferreira Batista, footballer
 19 October – Pedro Tiago Pereira Baptista, footballer

Deaths

 25 October – Adelino da Palma Carlos, lawyer, scholar and politician (born 1905)

References

 
Years of the 20th century in Portugal
Portugal